This is an incomplete list of headgear (anything worn on the head), both modern and historical.

Hats

Worn in the past, or rarely worn today

Men's

American fiber helmet – for use in tropical regions; similar to pith helmet
 Anthony Eden hat
 Beaver hat
 Beefeaters' hat
 Bicorne
 Boater, also basher, skimmer
 Boss of the plains
 Bowler, also coke hat, billycock, boxer, bun hat, derby
 Bycocket – a hat with a wide brim that is turned up in the back and pointed in the front
 Cabbage-tree hat – a hat woven from leaves of the cabbage tree
 Capotain (and women) – a tall conical hat, 17th century, usually black – also, copotain, copatain
 Caubeen – Irish hat
 Cavalier hat, also chevaliers – wide-brimmed hat trimmed with ostrich plumes
 Chapeau-bras, also chapeau-de-bras – 18th- to early-19th-century folding bicorne hat carried under one arm
 Chaperon – a series of hats that evolved in 14th- and 15th-century Europe from the medieval hood of the same name
 Cocked hat
 Colback – a fur headpiece of Turkish origin
 Deerstalker – hunting cap with fold-down ears, associated with Sherlock Holmes, Elmer Fudd, Holden Caulfield, and Ignatius Reilly
 Fedora
 Fez
 Hanfu hats and headwear – ancient Chinese hats
 Homburg
 Kolpik
 Labbade
 Litham
 Malahai
 Panama hat
 Papakha
 Pava
 Peci
 Pith helmet – for use in tropical regions; the American fiber helmet is a version of it
 Pork pie hat
 Shovel hat
 Shtreimel
 Sombrero
 Spodik
 Keffiyah or sudra
 Papal tiara – a hat traditionally worn by the Pope, which has been abandoned in recent decades, in favor of the mitre
 Top hat, also stovepipe hat, chimney pot hat, lum hat, or (in collapsible form) gibus
 Tricorne
 Trilby, sometimes (incorrectly) called "fedora"
 Wideawake hat
 Umbrella hat

Women's

 Bandeau hat
 Beaver hat
 Beehive
 Bergère hat
 Ba tầm, Vietnam
 Bloomer
 Bongrace – a velvet-covered headdress, stiffened with buckram – 16th century
 Breton – originating in 19th-century France, a lightweight hat, usually in straw, with upturned brim all the way round
 Capeline – 18th–19th century
 Capotain (and men) – a tall conical hat, 17th century, usually black – also, copotain, copatain
 Cartwheel hat – low crown, wide stiff brim
 Cocktail hat
 Doll hat – a scaled-down hat, usually worn tilted forward on the head
 Gainsborough hat – a very large hat often elaborately decorated with plumes, flowers, and trinkets
 Half hat – a millinery design that only covers part of the head and may be stiffened fabric or straw
 Hennin
 Kokoshnik
 Nón lá, Vietnam
 Ochipok
 Pamela hat
 Pussyhat - a pink, knitted hat created in large numbers by thousands of participants involved with the United States 2017 Women's March
 Tantour

Unclassified

 Archer's bonnet
 Balibuntal – straw hat from the Philippines
 Castor or caster – beaver or rabbit (see beaver hat)
 Chip hat
 Cloche hat
 Cockle hat
 Cony or coney
 Coolie hat
 Copintank, also copentank, coptank, copitaine
 Cordies
 Cossack hat
 Demicastor hat
 Directoire
 Dolly Varden
 Fan-tail hat
 Flat
 Garbo hat
 Garibaldi hat
 Gipsy hat
 Golden hat – from Bronze Age Europe
 Gossamer hat
 Grebe hat
 Halo hat – millinery design in which the headgear creates a circular frame for the face, creating a halo effect 
 Hat Terrai Gurkha, worn only by Gurkha Contingent officers in Singapore
 Homburg – a black Homburg was also known as an "Anthony Eden" (after the politician Anthony Eden)
 Hunting hat
 Jaapi of Assam, India
 Jerry
 Kausia
 Kevenhuller
 Kiss-me-quick hat
 Leghorn hat
 Mandarin hat
 Manilla hat
 Marquis hat
 Matinée hat
 Merry Widow hat
 Moab
 Montera
 Mourning hat
 Mousquetaire
 Müller hat
 Mushroom
 Petasos
 Pill box hat
 Pilotka
 Quadricorn – a four-cornered hat
 Sugar loaf
 Veiled hat, also bird cage hat

Caps

Caps worn by men in the past, or rarely worn today

 Aviator's cap
 Barretina
 Brodrick cap (a military cap named after St John Brodrick, 1st Earl of Midleton)
 Cap and bells ("jester cap", "jester hat" or "fool's cap")
 Capeline – a steel skullcap worn by archers in the Middle Ages
 Cricket cap
 Dunce cap
 Forage cap
 Gat, a mesh hat worn during the Joseon period in Korea.
 Hooker-doon, a cloth cap with a peak, in Scotland
 Icelandic tail-cap
 Jockey's cap
 Kalpak 
 Loovuuz – Mongolian fur headgear
 Monmouth cap
 Phrygian cap
 Pileus
 Sailor cap
 Shako
 Smoking cap 
 Sou'wester, or "Cape Ann" – a flexible waterproof hat traditionally worn by sailors
 Whoopee cap – a style of headwear popular among youths in the mid 20th century in the United States

Caps worn by women in the past
 Boudoir cap
 Icelandic tail-cap
 Juliet cap
 Mob-cap
 Pillbox cap
 Pinner

Caps worn on ceremonial occasions
 Black cap
 Cap of maintenance

Bonnets

Bonnets for women

 Cabriolet
 Capote – soft crown, rigid brim, nineteenth century
 Chip bonnet
 Gypsy bonnet – shallow to flat crown, saucer shaped, and worn by tying it on with either a scarf or sash, under the chin, or at the nape of the neck – nineteenth Century
 Kiss-me-quick
 Leghorn bonnet
 Mourning bonnet
 Poke bonnet – Early nineteenth century, "Christmas Carol" style, with a cylindrical crown and broad funnel brim
 Ugly – a kind of retractable visor that could be attached to bonnets for extra protection from the sun, nineteenth century

Bonnets for men
 Balmoral bonnet
 Blue bonnet, the ancestor of the Balmoral, feather, Glengarry and other men's bonnets
 Feather bonnet
 Glengarry bonnet
 Tam o'shanter

Helmets

Hoods

 Bashlyk
 Bongrace, the stiffened back of the hood when flipped over the forehead to provide shade; also a separate headdress to provide shade, worn with a hood or coif, Tudor/Elizabethan
 Bonnet head
 Capirote, traditionally worn by the Nazarenos of a Spanish Brotherhood during solemn penitence
 Chaperon (headgear) adaptable late Middle Ages "dead-chicken" hood and hat
 Flemish hood
 French hood
 Gable hood
 Hood – modern or historical, attached to tops or shirts, overcoats, cloaks, etc.
 Liripipe
 Mary Queen of Scots
 Medieval hood
 Mourning hood
 Riding hood
 Stuart hood

Headbands, headscarves, wimples

 Abaya
 Buknuk
 Chador
 Chaperon (headgear) adaptable late Middle Ages "dead-chicken" hat, hood and scarf
 Coif
 Crispine thirteenth century European women's style of padding hair in a net and headband
 Dupatta, also shayla or milfeh
 Headband
 Headscarf, also khimar, hijab,
 Khimar
 Liripipe
 Mandily (Greek Orthodox)
 Nemes
 Snood
 Veil
 Wimple

Masks, veils and headgear that covers the face

See Mask for a fuller list of masks.
 Balaclava (helmet) or ski mask
 Battoulah
 Bongrace – a shade for the face, sometimes part of a hood, or a separate garment worn with a hood or coif; Tudor/Elizabethan
 Boushiya
 Burqa, also burka, burga, burqua
 Diving mask
 Full-face diving mask
 Gas mask
 Orthodontic Facemask 

 Latex mask
 Litham
 Niqab
 Tagelmust, also cheich
 Tudong
 Veil
 Visor
 Wedding veil

Other headdress

Women's
 Alice band
 Bandanna
 Bandeau
 Fascinator
 Perak
 Visor
 Wreath

Men's
 Arab headdress
 A white cap or skullcap: * taqiya, also tagiyah, gahfiah
 covered by the flowing scarf: ghutrah, also gutra, smagh, shmagh, kaffiyeh, kufiyyeh, keffiyeh, keffiyah, kaffiye, keffiya
 Kept in place by a band around the cap and scarf: igal, also egal, agal, aqal, ogal
 Bandana, also bandanna
 Do-rag
 Stocking cap
 Topor – Bengali men's wedding headgear
 Upe
 Visor

Jeweled

 Coronet
 Crown
Holy Crown of Hungary
Imperial Crown of India
Imperial State Crown
St Edward's Crown
 Diadem
 Tiara
 Papal tiara

Wigs
 Toupee
 Wig

Headgear organised by function

Religious

Buddhist 
Black Crown of the Karma Kagyu sect
Kasa
Pan Zva (Hat with the long ears from the Pandita of Nyingma.)

Christian 
 Biretta
 Camauro
 Canterbury cap
 Cappello romano
 Galero
 Kalimavkion
 Klobuk
 Koukoulion
 Mantilla
 Mitre
 Papal tiara
 Skufia
 Wimple
 Zucchetto

Hindu 

 Mukut – Crown worn by Hindu deities
 Pagri – Indian Hindu turban
 Pheta – Marathi turban
 Rasam Pagri – religious ceremony of the turban
 Sarpech – ornament worn with turban

Jewish 
 Havalim (חֲבָליִם) ropes that are referenced in Kings I 20:31. Used as a sign of mourning. 
 Kashket
 Kippah or yarmulke
 Kolpik
 Migba'at was likely a cone-shaped Turban.  This turban was likely only worn in the context of the priesthood and is cited in Exodus 27:20–30.
 Mitpaḥat is a scarf that is worn on the head or hair, by some married women. Some wear scarves only during prayers, and others wear them in public.
 Mitznefet was most likely a classic circular turban. This is derived from the fact that Hebrew word Mitznefet comes from the root "to wrap." This turban was likely only worn in the context of the priesthood and is cited in Exodus 27:20–30.
 Pe’er mentioned in Ezekiel 24: 17;23. In verse 17, Ezekiel commands the Israelites to “wrap their” Pe’ers around their heads. In verse 23, Ezekiel tells the Israelite that their Pe’er's "shall remain on your heads.” ("Pe'er" (which translates into "splendor") is usually used to refer to phylacteries (tefillin))
 Sheitel is a wig worn by some married women in order to maintain marital modesty in public
 Shtreimel
 Spodik
 Gargush
 Sudra (סודרא) is a headdress, similar to the keffiyah worn by Jewish men in the ancient near-east.

Muslim 
 Hijab
 Types of hijab
 Kufi
 Fez
 Songkok
 Taqiyah (cap)
 Turban

Sikh 
 Sikh turban
 Patka
 Rumal
Dumalla
Taksali Dumalla
Patiala Shahi
Vattan Wali

Military and police
 Barretina
 Bearskin
 Beefeaters' hat
 Beret
 Bersagliere
 Bicorne
 Boonie hat
 Busby
 Campaign hat, also drill instructor hat, drill sergeant hat, ranger hat, sergeant hat, Smokey Bear hat
 Cap comforter, a woollen hat associated with British Commandos
 Cappello Alpino, hat worn by the Alpini troops of the Italian Army
 Caubeen
 Chapeau-bras, also chapeau de bras – 18th to early-19th-century folding bicorne hat carried under one arm
 Combination cap, also service cap, combination cover, peaked cap
 Custodian helmet, headwear of the British police officer, ranks of Sergeant and Constable
 Czapka
 Envelope Busby or Astrakhan, worn by Officer Cadets of the Royal Military College of Canada
 Feather bonnet
 Flying helmet – closely fitting solid helmet designed to resist impacts within the cockpit of military aircraft – colloquially known as a 'bone dome'''
 Garrison cap, also campaign cap, wedge cap, flight cap, garrison hat, overseas cap, side cap, field service cap
 Glengarry, also Glengarry bonnet, Glengarry cap
 Hardee hat
 Helmet
 Jeep cap
 Kartus – a peakless cap worn by the Swedish army during the Great Northern War. Called the Kabuds by the Danish and Norwegians and the Kartooze by the Russians, nations which also adopted it
 Kepi
 Mirliton – a high tubular concave hat with a "wing", worn by hussars in the 18th and early 19th centuries
 Mitre
 Patrol cap
 Pickelhaube – a spiked German leather helmet. 
 Sailor cap, also known as "white hat" or "dixie cup" in the US Navy
 Shako
 Shaguma - Yak-hair headdress used by early Imperial Japanese Army generals
 Slouch hat –  One side of hat droops down as opposed to the other which is pinned against the side of the crown
 Tarleton helmet – A leather helmet with a large crest. Popular with cavalry and light infantry in the late 18th and early 19th century. Named after British military commander, Banastre Tarleton. 
 Tricorn – Three-cornered hat synonymous with the 18th century. Worn by musketeers, dragoons and cuirassiers of all western armies, also often by French grenadiers (which was uncommon considering that most grenadiers at the time wore mitres or bearskins).
 War bonnet, the feathered headdress worn warriors and chiefs of Plains Indians.

Officials and civil workers

China (historical)
 Qing official headwear
 Futou
 Song official headwear
 Tang official headwear

Other specialist headgear
 Casquette, or cycling cap
 Chef's hat, also toque blanche, or more familiarly, toque Coronet
 Cowboy hat
 Crown
 Cucupha
 Energy dome
 Firefighter's helmet
 Gas mask
 Green eyeshade
 Headlamp
 Night cap
 Nurse's cap
 Orthodontic headgear
 Party hat
 Printer's hat also pressman's hat
 Propeller hat (propeller beanie)
 Santa's hat
 rubber boot, unique signature headgear of American political figure Vermin Supreme
 Scrum cap
 Shower cap, a flexible plastic covering to protect the hair from getting wet, as used when taking a shower.
 Space helmet
 Square academic cap
 Stormy Kromer cap
 Swimming cap, also "swim cap" and "bathing cap"
 Tin foil hat
 Topor – Bengali men's wedding headgear
 Visor
 Watermelon Helmet
 Wedding veil

National dress; association with a country, people and religion

 Aso Oke Hat – Yoruba people
 Barretina – Catalan
 Bearskin hat
 Beret – French, Basque
 Bhatgaunle Topi – Nepal
 Blangkon – Javanese and Sundanese people
 Breton, also Bretonne Chupalla – Chilean
 Chullo – Peruvian
 Clop – Romanian
 Coolie hat
 Coonskin hat – American frontiersman
 Cork hat – Australia
 Cossack hat
 Dogon hat – Dogon people, West Africa
 Feathered headdress – Native American
 Flat cap – English people and Irish people
 Four Winds hat – Sami people
 Fulani hat – Fula people, West Africa
 Glengarry bonnet
 Għonnella or Faldetta – Maltese
 Haida hat
 Irish walking hat – Irish people
 Kimeshek - Kazakhstan, Karakalpakstan and Kyrgyzstan
 Kofia – Swahili people, East Africa
 Kufi – West Africa
 Leopard cap – Igbo people, West Africa
 Mandarin hat – Chinese
 Mokorotlo – Basotho/Lesotho
 Montenegrin cap – Montenegrins, Serbs
 Lungee (Afghan Turban) - Pashtun people, Afghanistan
 Pakol – Pashtun people, Afghanistan
 Phrygian cap – Roman, French
 Qeleshe – Albanian
 Šajkača – Serbian
 Salakot – Filipino
 Shreepech – Traditional Crown of Monarch of Nepal
 Slouch hat, also digger hat'', Australia and New Zealand
 Songkok – Malay-speaking peoples of Indonesia, Malaysia, Brunei and Singapore
 Tam o'shanter – Scottish
 Tarboosh
 Tembel hat - Israel
 Ti'i langga – Rote Island 
 Top hat – English
 Topor – Bengali men's wedding headgear
 Turban
 Tuque or toque – Canadian, esp. French-Canadian/Québécois
 Upe - Bougainville
 Ushanka – Russian
 Welsh hat
 Witch hat - Galician
 Zulu crown – Zulu people, Southern Africa, see kufi for information

By ethnicity

Chinese 

 Futou
 Guan – mianguan, fengguan, pibian, tongtianguan
 Liangmao
 List of Hanfu headwear
 Weimao
 Damao
 Humao

Korean 

 Jokduri
 Gat

Mongol 

 Boli hat
 Gugu hat

See also

 List of hat styles
 Pointy hat
 The Philippi Collection
 Jaapi
 Asian conical hat

References

 
Caps
Clothing-related lists

sv:Huvudbonad#Lista över huvudbonader